A Frolic of His Own is a book by William Gaddis, published by Poseidon Press in 1994. It was his fourth novel, and it won his second U.S. National Book Award for Fiction.

Title
The title is from a judicial decision about vicarious liability in Joel v. Morison.

Plot

Oscar Crease is hospitalized after a car injury. He had short-circuited the ignition of his car while standing in front of it, and the driverless car then drove over him. His stepsister Christina and her lawyer husband Harry Lutz visit him and bring him the legal opinion prepared by his father, a circuit judge, concerning the case of Szyrk v. the Village of Tatamount et al. This case concerns a situation where a dog got entrapped by a steel sculpture created by Mr. Szyrk. To free the dog a destructive procedure has to be performed on the sculpture, but the sculptor tries to prevent this and is granted a preliminary injunction by the judge.

Back at home in the Hamptons, Oscar is recovering. He is trying to build a legal case against the movie producer Constantine Kiester and his associates who he asserts have infringed upon his copyright of his unpublished play. Both the play and the movie describe an event during the Civil War, where Oscar's grandfather, later to be a judge on the Holmes court, hired two substitutes to fight for him, one for the South, the other for the North. At the battle of Antietam they meet, fight and kill each other.

Oscar engages a lawyer, Harold Basie, and reads pieces of his script to show him similarities, although he had not seen the movie. Basie takes the case, while the defendants happen to use Harry Lutz's legal firm to represent them. A deposition is taken and Oscar is examined. A settlement is offered, but he rejects it and proceeds with his suit. After losing the trial, he goes into the appeal process.

Oscar is cared for by his stepsister Christina and his girlfriend Lily and is visited by Trish and "Jerry," i.e., Jawaharlal Madhar Pai, the lawyer who had conducted the deposition. Jerry and Oscar discuss his play at length. In the appeal process, Oscar wins his case against the movie makers, and believes he will get millions. His father, a judge, had helped by writing a legal brief. He dies before Oscar can thank him, and his clerk visits Oscar.

When Christina's husband dies in a car accident she expects to be the beneficiary of his life insurance, but his legal firm had made itself the beneficiary of his insurance. Oscar learns that "creative accounting" of the very successful movie results in a loss, so he will not see any money. The inheritance of Oscar's and Christina's father is burdened with expenses so that, in the end, they can just keep the house. Oscar becomes more and more childish.

Comments
Much like Gaddis’ 1975 novel J R, the novel is largely based on dialogue, interspersed occasionally by narratives, some of them in a stream-of-consciousness. The dialogue is generally not attributed, and characters are defined by what they say and how they say it. The reader will also find legal opinions, a deposition, and excerpts of Oscar's play, "Once at Antietam," as being read by participants. Everybody is involved in lawsuits that grow and sprout seemingly without limits, giving none of the participants any satisfaction. Most of the human activity takes place at Oscar Crease's home out in the wetlands of Long Island, and in some expositions, the reader gets a glimpse of the beautiful landscape that surrounds it.

References

External links
Annotations to A Frolic of His Own at williamgaddis.org
William Gaddis and American Justice at The Millions.com

1994 American novels
Postmodern novels
National Book Award for Fiction winning works
Novels by William Gaddis
Poseidon Press books